The Jathika Nidahas Peramuna (JNP) or National Freedom Front (NFF) is a political party in Sri Lanka which was formed by ten JVP parliamentarians led by Wimal Weerawansa, as a breakaway group of the Janatha Vimukthi Peramuna (JVP).

The NFF commenced political activities on 14 May 2008. The party is also notable for being the first party in Sri Lanka to launch its own official website (then www.nffsrilanka.com).

Background

Janatha Vimukthi Peramuna (JVP), a Marxist-Leninist political party in Sri Lanka, was formed in 1965 by a breakaway group of the Ceylon Communist Party (Maoist) led by Rohana Wijeweera. The JVP was involved in two armed uprisings against the ruling governments in 1971 and between 1987 and 1989. After 1989, the JVP entered electoral politics by participating in the 1994 parliamentary election.

Due to misconduct and various other charges against Wimal Weerawansa, the leadership of the JVP decided to suspend the membership of Wimal Weerawansa and expel him from the party on 21 March 2008. As the media reports, Weerawansa had an argument with the leadership based on the disarmament of the Tamil Makkal Viduthalai Puligal (TMVP) political party, a breakaway faction of the LTTE which was contesting in the country's Eastern provincial council elections May 2008 under the banner of the ruling United People's Freedom Alliance (UPFA).

JVP MP Piyasiri Wijenayake accused the main opposition party, the United National Party, of conspiring against the JVP, during a media conference held at the Nippon Hotel Colombo on 8 April 2008.

The dissident faction led by Wimal Weerawansa visited the most senior Buddhist monks of the Asgiriya and Malwatte chapters on 20 April 2008, to "obtain blessings for their new political movement". The UNP was again accused of orchestrating a conspiracy to divide and destabilize the JVP, this time by Weerawansa.

The party commenced political activities on 14 May 2008, the same day Rohana Wijeweera formed the JVP in 1965, and also the day of the infamous Anuradhapura massacre carried out by the LTTE, where 146 pilgrims at the Jaya Sri Maha Bodhi in Anuradhapura were brutally murdered by the LTTE. The party leaders who addressed the inaugural ceremony at BMICH Colombo claimed that the new political party would be an alternative party to the two main political parties, the UNP and the SLFP.

Bibliography

See also
Weerakumara Dissanayake

References

External links
Official Web site of the party (JNP)
Official web site of JVP

 
2008 establishments in Sri Lanka
Nationalist parties in Sri Lanka
Political parties established in 2008
Political parties in Sri Lanka
United People's Freedom Alliance
Sinhalese nationalist parties